Ships of Merior is volume two of The Wars of Light and Shadow by Janny Wurts.

Arc II of The Wars of Light and Shadow was released in several different formats. The US hard cover edition of The Ships of Merior contained the entirety of Arc II.  However, due to page limits for binding of paperbacks, Arc II was released in paperback format as two separate books - The Ships of Merior being the first part of Arc II and Warhost of Vastmark being the second part of Arc II.

External links
Ships of Merior Webpage
Ships of Merior Excerpt

References

American fantasy novels
Wars of Light and Shadow
HarperCollins books
1994 American novels